Evolvable hardware (EH) is a field focusing on the use of evolutionary algorithms (EA) to create specialized electronics without manual engineering. It brings together reconfigurable hardware, evolutionary computation, fault tolerance and autonomous systems. Evolvable hardware refers to hardware that can change its architecture and behavior dynamically and autonomously by interacting with its environment.

Introduction
In its most fundamental form an evolutionary algorithm manipulates a population of individuals where each individual describes how to construct a candidate circuit. Each circuit is assigned a fitness, which indicates how well a candidate circuit satisfies the design specification. The evolutionary algorithm uses stochastic operators to evolve new circuit configurations from existing ones. Done properly, over time the evolutionary algorithm will evolve a circuit configuration that exhibits desirable behavior.

Each candidate circuit can either be simulated or physically implemented in a reconfigurable device. Typical reconfigurable devices are field-programmable gate arrays (for digital designs) or field-programmable analog arrays (for analog designs). At a lower level of abstraction are the field-programmable transistor arrays that can implement either digital or analog designs.

The concept was pioneered by Adrian Thompson at the University of Sussex, England, who in 1996 used an FPGA to evolve a tone discriminator that used fewer than 40 programmable logic gates, and had no clock signal. This is a remarkably small design for such a device, and relied on exploiting peculiarities of the hardware that engineers normally avoid. For example, one group of gates has no logical connection to the rest of the circuit, yet is crucial to its function.

Motivation
In many cases, conventional design methods (formulas, etc.) can be used to design a circuit. But in other cases, the design specification doesn't provide sufficient information to permit using conventional design methods. For example, the specification may only state desired behavior of the target hardware.

In other cases, an existing circuit must adapt—i.e., modify its configuration—to compensate for faults or perhaps a changing operational environment. For instance, deep-space probes may encounter sudden high radiation environments, which alter a circuit's performance; the circuit must self-adapt to restore as much of the original behavior as possible.

Finding the fitness of an evolved circuit
The fitness of an evolved circuit is a measure of how well the circuit matches the design specification. Fitness in evolvable hardware problems is determined via two methods:
 extrinsic evolution: all circuits are simulated to see how they perform,
 intrinsic evolution: physical tests are run on actual hardware.

In extrinsic evolution, only the final best solution in the final population of the evolutionary algorithm is physically implemented, whereas with intrinsic evolution every individual in every generation of the EA's population is physically realized and tested.

Future research directions
Evolvable hardware problems fall into two categories: original design and adaptive systems. Original design uses evolutionary algorithms to design a system that meets a predefined specification. Adaptive systems reconfigure an existing design to counteract faults or a changed operational environment.

Original design of digital systems is not of much interest because industry already can synthesize enormously complex circuitry. For example, one can buy intellectual property cores to synthesize USB port circuitry, ethernet microcontrollers and even entire RISC processors.  Some research into original design still yields useful results, for example genetic algorithms have been used to design logic systems with integrated fault detection that outperform hand designed equivalents.

Original design of analog circuitry is still a wide-open research area. Indeed, the analog design industry is nowhere near as mature as is the digital design industry. Adaptive systems has been and remains an area of intense interest.

See also
 Self-management (computer science)
 Programmable logic device

References

Further reading

External links
 NASA-DoD-sponsored conference 2004
 NASA-DoD-sponsored conference 2005
 NASA/ESA Conference on Adaptive Hardware and Systems (AHS-2006)
 NASA/ESA Conference on Adaptive Hardware and Systems (AHS-2007)
 NASA used a genetic algorithm to design a novel antenna (see PDF paper for details)
 Evolutionary Electronics at the University of Sussex

Electronic design